Diophila bathrota is a moth in the family Autostichidae. It is found in South Africa.

References

Natural History Museum Lepidoptera generic names catalog

Endemic moths of South Africa
Autostichinae
Moths described in 1911